Alfonso Signorini (born 7 April 1964) is an Italian television host and journalist.

Biography
Signorini was born in Milan. He was engaged to Paolo Galimberti.

Television
Chiambretti c'è (Rai 2, 2002)
L'isola dei famosi (Rai 2, 2003–2007)
Markette (La7, 2004–2008)
Ritorno al presente (Rai 1, 2005)
Verissimo (Canale 5, 2006–2012)
Scherzi a parte (Canale 5, 2007)
Grande Fratello (Canale 5, 2008–2012)
Maurizio Costanzo Show (Canale 5, 2009)
Kalispéra! (Canale 5, 2010–2011)
La notte degli chef (Canale 5, 2011)
Opera on Ice (Canale 5, 2011–2012)
Studio 5 (Canale 5, 2013)
Grande Fratello VIP (Canale 5), 2016-

Books
 Costantino desnudo, s.l., Maestrale Company-Lele Mora, 2004. 
 Il Signorini. Chi c'è c'è, chi non c'è s'incazza, Milano, Mondadori, 2006. 
 Troppo fiera, troppo fragile. Il romanzo della Callas, Milano, Mondadori, 2007. 
 Chanel. Una vita da favola, Milano, Mondadori, 2009. 
 Blu come il sangue. Storie di delitti nell'alta società, con Massimo Picozzi, Milano, Mondadori, 2010. 
 Marylin. Vivere e morire d'amore, Milano, Mondadori, 2010. 
 L'altra parte di me, Milano, Mondadori, 2015. 
 Ciò che non muore mai. Il romanzo di Chopin, Milano, Mondadori, 2017.

References

External links 
Alfonso Signorini - Mediaset
Alfonso Signorini - La 7

1964 births
Living people
Italian television presenters
Mass media people from Milan
Gay entertainers
Italian LGBT entertainers
Italian magazine editors
21st-century LGBT people